Bart Lambriex (born 3 October 1998 in Haarlem) is a sailor from the Netherlands.

By finishing on the 8th place at the 2019 49er & 49er FX World Championships on December 8, 2019 in Auckland together with his partner Pim van Vugt, he grabbed one of the four available international qualification spots for the 2020 Summer Olympics.) On October 4, 2020 by finishing on the 6th place at the 2020 49er & 49er FX & Nacra17 European Championships in Lake Attersee in Austria, he also met the full national standards for qualifying for the above.

He is, with Floris van de Werken, the 2021 and 2022 49er World Champion

References

External links
 
 
 

1998 births
Living people
Dutch male sailors (sport)
Olympic sailors of the Netherlands
Sailors at the 2020 Summer Olympics – 49er
Sportspeople from Haarlem
49er class sailors
49er class world champions
20th-century Dutch people
21st-century Dutch people